Omar Suleiman (born 1986) is an American Muslim scholar, civil rights leader, writer, and public speaker. He is the Founder and President of Yaqeen Institute for Islamic Research, and an adjunct professor of Islamic Studies and member of the Ethics Center Advisory Board at Southern Methodist University. He is currently the Resident Scholar of the Valley Ranch Islamic Center and the Co-chair Emeritus of Faith Forward Dallas at Thanks-Giving Square, a multi-faith coalition of clergy for peace and justice.

Early life and education
Suleiman was born to a Palestinian family in New Orleans in 1986.

Suleiman holds Bachelor's degrees in accounting and Islamic law, Master's degrees in Islamic finance and political history. He completed doctoral studies in Islamic thought and civilization at the International Islamic University Malaysia.

Career
Upon returning to New Orleans, he served as the Imam of the Jefferson Muslim Association for six years, and as director of the "Muslims for Humanity" Hurricane Katrina relief effort in late 2005. He co-founded the East Jefferson Interfaith Clergy Association and was awarded for outstanding civic achievement by the Mayor and City Council of New Orleans in 2010.

In 2016, Suleiman founded the Muslim think-tank, Yaqeen Institute for Islamic Research. He is also the founding director of MUHSEN (Muslims Understanding and Helping Special Education Needs) – a non-profit umbrella organization that aims to create more inclusive Muslim communities that better cater to the disabled and their families.

He was  Professor of Islamic Studies at Southern Methodist University where he was also a member of the Maguire Ethics Center Advisory Board.

He is  Resident Scholar of the Valley Ranch Islamic Center and co-chair of Faith Forward Dallas at Thanks-Giving Square.

Suleiman was also featured in the Inspiration Series which aimed to impart moral lessons from the life and example of the Islamic prophet Muhammad through a drama mini-series. The series was widely viewed globally and won the award for Best Movie at the 2016 International Contribution to Dawah Awards in Dubai.

Activism
Suleiman has engaged in social justice organizing and activism on a host of progressive causes. He stated that Donald Trump's presidency "fatigues" American citizens. He also "considers [himself] a student of Malcolm X" and believes that "his most important contribution to the revolution is his idea that the greatest casualty of the subjugation of African Americans was the loss of black consciousness." He has expressed that "America is a work in progress, and the most patriotic Americans are those that demand it live up to its promise." He also believes that "Muslim theology can be a source of liberation."

In July 2016, he marched with demonstrators in Dallas against the killings of Alton Sterling and Philando Castile. These demonstrations would eventually be punctuated by a deadly shooting in which five police officers were killed in retaliation for police shootings of African Americans. Suleiman recalls "an eternity of gunshots" ringing out just as the march came to a close. In the wake of the shooting, Imam Omar Suleiman was invited to lead the invocation at a memorial service for the slain officers attended by President Barack Obama and former first lady Michelle Obama, then-former Vice President Joe Biden and his wife Jill Biden, as well as George W. Bush and former first lady Laura Bush.

Since 2015, Suleiman has frequently visited Syrian refugee camps delivering aid with Muslim humanitarian relief group Helping Hand for Relief and Development.

Suleiman led airport demonstrations in Dallas in reaction to the Trump travel ban, which has since come to be known as the "Muslim ban" due to its restricting immigration from 7 predominantly Muslim-majority nations, as well as Trump's call for a temporary ban on Muslim entry into the United States following the 2015 San Bernardino attack, and again after the Orlando nightclub shooting.

In 2017, Suleiman was arrested on Capitol Hill protesting outside of the office of then-House Speaker Congressman Paul Ryan. He had been participating in sit-in demonstration calling for comprehensive immigration reform. He later led a group of clergy to the U.S.–Mexico border to protest in solidarity with and meet migrants affected by Trump's family separation policy.

He has also worked to assist families of victims of police brutality, voiced support for the Black Lives Matter movement, and underscored the importance of anti-racism work more broadly.

Suleiman has advocated on behalf of Jamil Abdullah Al-Amin and members of the Holy Land Foundation (also known as "the HLF 5") such as Ghassan Elashi whom Suleiman views as political prisoners.

In December 2021, Suleiman was the keynote speaker at the Russell Tribunal on War Crimes on Kashmir hosted in Sarajevo, Bosnia-Hercegovina.

Threat from ISIS
In March 2017, ISIS called for his assassination, among a number of other prominent Western Muslim faith leaders, in a propaganda film titled "Kill The Apostate Imams." The call was in response to a video Suleiman produced with Pastor Andrew Stoker of First United Methodist Church Dallas titled "An Imam, a Pastor and a Dream," in which he calls for unity between Christians and Muslims in the United States and around the world. Suleiman responded to the threat stating, "I believe that their venom needs to be condemned. They’ve hijacked my religion."

Recognition
Suleiman's work in the fields of community service, interfaith dialogue, and social justice led to his award for outstanding civic achievement by the Mayor and City Council of New Orleans in 2010.

He was featured as a "rising star" in Ozy Magazine and dubbed "The Religious Leader Dallas Needs" by the D Magazine.

Suleiman was also the subject of a BBC documentary in 2016 highlighting the experience of Muslims in Texas facing rising Islamophobia, and a 2017 PBS documentary showcasing his work with Syrian refugees.

On May 9, 2019, Suleiman served as the congressional guest chaplain upon the invitation of Rep. Eddie Bernice Johnson and delivered the day's opening invocation.

In addition to being recognized by CNN as one of 25 Muslim American change-makers, Suleiman was also included in The Muslim 500 – an annual ranking of the world's most influential Muslims compiled by The Royal Islamic Strategic Studies Centre in Amman, Jordan.

In observation of Frederick Douglass' bicentennial, the Antiracist Research and Policy Center at American University and Frederick Douglass Family Initiatives recognized Suleiman among 200 honorees whose work was deemed to best embody the legacy of the abolitionist’s commitment to social change.

The Texas House of Representatives honored Imam Omar Suleiman in March 2022 for his role in assisting during the Colleyville synagogue hostage crisis. As congregants in a Sabbath service were being kept hostage by a lone gunman, Suleiman drove to the Congregation Beth Israel synagogue and volunteered to partake in hostage negotiations.

Books
Prayers of the Pious, 2019. 
Allah Loves..., 2020. 
Repentance: Breaking Habits of Sin, 2020. 
40 on Justice: The Prophetic Voice on Social Reform, 2021. 
Angels in Your Presence, 2021. 
Meeting Muhammad, 2022.

References

Further reading

1986 births
Living people
People from New Orleans
Activists from New Orleans
YouTubers from Louisiana
American Sunni Muslim scholars of Islam
American imams
American civil rights activists
American YouTubers
American people of Palestinian descent
Activists for African-American civil rights
People in interfaith dialogue
International Islamic University Malaysia alumni
Southern Methodist University faculty
20th-century American people
21st-century imams
21st-century Muslim scholars of Islam
21st-century American male writers
21st-century American non-fiction writers
Date of birth missing (living people)